Phillip Cannie (born 12 November 1977 in Greenock), is a Scottish football striker who plays for Scottish amateur side Sporting Larkfield F.C.

Cannie began his career with Port Glasgow, and stepped up to the senior game with Clyde in the summer of 2000. He scored on his Clyde debut, in a 2-1 Scottish Challenge Cup defeat against Ross County. He also scored on his league debut the following month against Airdrie, but he found first team chances limited at Broadwood Stadium, and left in March 2001, after scoring 3 goals in 16 appearances.

He went back to the juniors with Pollok, before joining his hometown team Greenock Morton. He stayed at Cappielow for just over two years, before returning to the junior leagues to play for Kilwinning Rangers, Kirkintilloch Rob Roy, Maryhill, Neilston, Johnstone Burgh and finally Largs Thistle. He now plays amateur football for Scottish amateur side Gourock Amateurs.

References

External links

Living people
1977 births
Scottish footballers
Clyde F.C. players
Greenock Morton F.C. players
Scottish Football League players
Scottish Junior Football Association players
Association football forwards
Footballers from Greenock
Kirkintilloch Rob Roy F.C. players
Kilwinning Rangers F.C. players
Largs Thistle F.C. players
Johnstone Burgh F.C. players
Pollok F.C. players
Maryhill F.C. players